or  is a dish eaten in Vietnam as breakfast. It may be served either as a soup or dry with no broth.

 became popular in the 1960s in Southern Vietnam, especially in Saigon. The primary ingredients of this dish are pork bones, mixed with diverse kinds of noodles, herbs and other kind of meats.

In southern Vietnamese cuisine, phở is usually served with –like noodles called  instead of the wider  or  popular in northern cuisine.

Hủ tiếu was featured in Master Chef US 2013, where Gordon Ramsay mentioned it being on the top of his list and tasked the contestants to prepare a bowl of hu tieu. The noodle dish also appeared on the TV show "Gordon's Great Escape" in 2010-2011, where Ramsay tried the noodle dish in Cai Rang floating market, Can Tho.

Origin 
Hủ tiếu originated  from the cuisine of the Teochew people who migrated to Vietnam via Cambodia from northeastern of Guangdong province, China, when it was first known as kuyteav. For the first localised variant of Hủ tiếu originating in Vietnam (known as Hủ tiếu nam vang), the rice noodles had a softer texture and flat appearance like Phở. Southern Vietnamese then recreated the noodles and produced a chewy texture for the rice noodle, the commonly seen texture for Hủ tiếu noodles nowadays.

The word hủ tiếu came from the Teochew dialect 粿條 (guê2diou5 or kway teow).

Ingredients 
Hủ tiếu mainly consists of pork bone broth, noodles, and various types of toppings, including meat and other garnishes.

Noodles
There are different types of noodles for Hủ tiếu, such as soft rice noodles, egg noodles, or chewy tapioca noodles. The tapioca noodles are chewier and more translucent and are used in Hu Tieu My Tho, and they are called hủ tiếu dai (chewy hủ tiếu).

Broth 
The broth is often made of pork bones, dried squid and dried shrimp. For hủ tiếu made in Southern Vietnam, the broth is made to be a little sweet to match with Southern Vietnamese's taste. Hu Tieu can be eaten dry (no broth), or wet (with broth), or the noodle dish can be served dry with a bowl of hot broth on the side.

Toppings 
There are various types of toppings, such as sautéed ground pork, sliced pork liver, pork intestines, poached shrimps, Chinese celery and chives, sautéed garlic and shallots. Not all of these ingredients need to be present and one can switch or add toppings depending on their taste, making different hủ tiếu dishes such as Hu Tieu My Tho which includes seafood.

Variations 
Popular varieties of  include:
  ("Hu tieu Phnom Penh") comes from Cambodian kuyteav
  ("Shacha hu tieu") based on a Teochew dish
   served on prawns, octopus, cuttlefish, and snails on thin, white rice noodles
   served on white rice noodles
Hủ tiếu gõ (gõ means knocking) is a street food version of hủ tiếu. It has this name because the vendors often travel around local areas on pushcart vehicles (xe đẩy) and announce themselves by knocking two metal bars together.

See also 

 Vietnamese cuisine

References 

Vietnamese soups